Nikolai Olegovich Rasskazov (born 4 January 1998) is a Russian football player. He plays as a right-back for PFC Krylia Sovetov Samara.

Club career
He made his debut in the Russian Football National League for FC Spartak-2 Moscow on 23 March 2017 in a game against FC Baltika Kaliningrad.

He made his debut in the Russian Premier League for FC Spartak Moscow due to the injury of Salvatore Bocchetti on 11 August 2018 as a starter in a game against FC Anzhi Makhachkala.

On 1 October 2020, he joined FC Arsenal Tula on loan.

On 8 June 2022, Rasskazov extended his contract with Spartak until 2023.

On 27 January 2023, Rasskazov signed a 3.5-year contract with PFC Krylia Sovetov Samara.

Honours
Spartak Moscow
Russian Cup: 2021–22

Career statistics

References

External links
 
 
 
 Profile by Russian Football National League

1998 births
People from Yefremovsky District
Sportspeople from Tula Oblast
Living people
Russian footballers
Association football defenders
Russia youth international footballers
Russia under-21 international footballers
FC Spartak-2 Moscow players
FC Spartak Moscow players
FC Arsenal Tula players
PFC Krylia Sovetov Samara players
Russian First League players
Russian Premier League players